The Mimungkum were an indigenous Australian people of Cape York Peninsula in northern Queensland.

Language
The Mimungkum spoke a dialect of Wik Mungkan.

Country
The Mimungkum were a small tribe restricted to an estimated  of territory 12 miles inland and south of Cape Keerweer in the Gulf of Carpentaria and on the Kendall River.

People
The Mimungkum are one of the Wik peoples, but the Wik form of their ethnonym was not recorded, unless it is this tribe that is referred to in a reference to a tribe called the Wikmumin in this area.

Notes

Citations

Sources

Aboriginal peoples of Queensland